Neostenanthera is a genus of flowering plant in the Annonaceae family. All discovered species are native to continental Africa. It contains the following species, according to The Plant List:
 Neostenanthera gabonensis (Engl. & Diels) Exell
 Neostenanthera hamata (Benth.) Exell
 Neostenanthera myristicifolia (Oliv.) Exell
 Neostenanthera neurosericea (Diels) Exell
 Neostenanthera robsonii Le Thomas

References

 
Annonaceae genera
Taxonomy articles created by Polbot